Macrocheilus viduatus is a species of ground beetle in the subfamily Anthiinae. It was described by Peringuey in 1899.

References

Anthiinae (beetle)
Beetles described in 1899